Graham Scambler (born 1948) is a sociologist, specializing in medical sociology.

Life and work
Scambler completed a B.Sc in Philosophy and Sociology at the University of Surrey in 1971, followed by a Ph.D. in Sociology (supervised by George Brown at Bedford College, University of London. His PhD thesis was on the stigma experienced by adults with epilepsy living in the community.

He was appointed Lecturer in Sociology at Charing Cross Hospital Medical School in 1972-5. He then moved to the Middlesex Hospital Medical School from 1978-87 which became part of University College London (UCL). He was appointed Professor of Medical Sociology at UCL in 2001. He retired from UCL in 2013.

He is author or editor of several books and has written over 100 chapters and peer-reviewed papers. He is founding co-editor of the international journal Social Theory and Health.

Awards
 Fellow of the Academy of Social Sciences

Publications
 Patrick,D & Scambler,G (Eds) (1982). Sociology as applied to medicine. London: Bailliere Tindall/W.B.Saunders (6 editions)
 Fitzpatrick,R., Hinton, J., Newman,S., Scambler, G. & Thompson, J. (1984). The experience of illness. London: Tavistock.
 Scambler, G. (Ed)(1987). Sociological theory and medical sociology. London: Tavistock
 Scambler, G. (1989). Epilepsy. London: Tavistock
 Scambler, A. & Scambler, G. (1993). Menstrual disorders. London: Routledge.
 Scambler, G. & Scambler, A. (Eds.)(1997). Rethinking prostitution. London: Routledge
 Scambler, G. & Higgs, P. (Eds)(1998). Modernity, medicine and health. London: Routledge
 Scambler, G. (Ed)(2001). Habermas, critical theory and health. London: Routledge
 Scambler, G. (2002). Health and social change. Buckingham: Open University Press
 Scambler, G. (Ed)(2005). Medical sociology. London: Routledge.
 Scambler, G. & Scambler, S. (Eds.)(2010). New directions in the sociology of chronic and disabling conditions. London: Palgrave.
 Scambler, G. (Ed.)(2012). Contemporary theorists and medical sociology. London: Routledge.
 Aksei Tjora & Scambler, G. (eds.) Café Society w York : Palgrave Macmillan, [2013]

References

External links
Personal website
Official web page at UCL

British sociologists
Academics of University College London
1948 births
Living people
Medical sociologists